Lullism is a term for the later philosophical and theological currents related to the Ramon Llull (ca. 1232-1315), a philosopher from the Kingdom of Mallorca located what is now Spain. Lullism also refers to the project of editing and disseminating Llull's works. The earliest centers of Lullism were in fourteenth-century France, Mallorca, and Italy.

Llull's early followers in France, for instance, were theologians at the University of Paris who believed that Llull's Art could provide a universal science to replace the traditional university curriculum.

Later forms of Lullism have been associated with mysticism, alchemy, encyclopaedism, and evangelism and have usually involved diagrammatic imagery. Notable Lullists were Nicholas of Cusa, Jacques Lefèvre d'Étaples, Francisco Jiménez de Cisneros, Gottfried Leibniz, Giordano Bruno, Johann Heinrich Alsted, and Ivo Salzinger.

Academic Lullism
Lullism in France started at the University of Paris after Ramon Llull visited Paris in the 1280s and his books became available to the academic world. Some scholastic theologians saw in Llull's Art a new scientific and demonstrative method for theology, given that Aristotelian logic was not sufficient for acquiring knowledge of God (or proving the truths of the faith). Collections of manuscripts of Llull's works  at the Sorbonne and the Carthusian Monastery at Vauvert laid the foundation for the study of Llull both in France and further afield. Although Jean Gerson had forbidden Llull's works to be taught in the Arts Faculty in Paris at the end of the fourteenth century, the study of Llull increased in the fifteenth century. There was a Lullian school in Barcelona that produced academics who taught in Bologna, Venice, and Padua. Lullism only officially came back to Paris with Jacques Lefèvre d'Étaples who taught at the Collège du Cardinal Lemoine at the University of Paris at the beginning of the sixteenth century. Lefèvre also published eight of Llull's works and was active in circulating them internationally. He seems to have been interested in the Lullian Art especially as a method of contemplation and sent copies of Llull's books to religious houses. Another Lullist very active in publishing was Bernard de Lavinheta who had come to Paris briefly in 1515 and continued to be active in Lyon and Cologne. Like Llull's early Parisian proponents, Lavinheta sought to show that the Lullian Art laid the foundation for a general science.

Mystical Theology
Other thinkers were attracted to the Lullian Art because its combinatorial, visual, and algebraic aspects allowed for new modes of theological language and imagery. Like his teacher Heymeric de Campo who had studied Llull's works in Paris before teaching at Cologne, Nicholas of Cusa possessed many of Llull's books. Nicholas of Cusa appropriated diagrammatic aspects of Llull's thought for his own mystical theology. Whereas Llull's use of figures and combinatorics had been literal and systematic, Nicholas of Cusa deployed geometrical figures as metaphors for seeing and not seeing, knowing and not knowing, oneness and otherness, etc., with respect to understanding God.

Alchemy and Hermeticism

Early modern hermeticism and alchemical-magical literature drew on the Lullian and pseudo-Lullian corpus in various ways. Giordano Bruno commented on the Lullian Art as early as 1582 in the work De compendiosa   architectura et complemento Artis Lullii. He then included Lullian aspects in his work on mnemonics the De umbris idearum that begins with a group of thirty intentiones (the will seeking the light of divinity through its shadows),  illustrated by a wheel with thirty lettered divisions. He went on to publish a lecture commentary on the Lullian system, De lampade combinatoria lulliana in 1587. At the end of the sixteenth century the teaching of Paracelsus and Cornelius Agrippa also fostered the production of manuals and commentaries on pseudo-Lullian alchemical and medical works in collaboration with the Strasbourg printer Lazarus Zetzner.

Evangelism and the New World
Llull originally formulated his Art to prove the truth of the Christian faith to all the people of the world starting from general principles. In this vein many early Spanish missionaries to the New World were Lullists or familiar with Llull's thought. The Cardinal Francisco Jiménez de Cisneros who had spearheaded a reform in Spain had also mobilized an effort to edit many of Llull's works. He also was responsible for sending a group of Franciscan missionaries on Columbus's second expedition to the Americas. Some years later the missionary Diego de Valadés wrote one of the manuals most influenced by Lullism, the Rhetorica Christiana. In this work he explains how a preacher might ascend and descend through levels of causation based on a Lullian system of divine principles and subjects of being. He also included many images, both trees and other figures.

Humanist Encyclopaedism and Rationalism

Llull's works appeared increasingly in print in the course of the sixteenth century. Lefèvre in France and Cardinal Cisneros in Spain embarked on projects to publish Llull's works. Bernard de Lavinheta and Charles Bovelles continued editing and publishing Lullian texts with humanist printers such as Jodocus Badius. Lavinheta also published his own Lullist-encyclopaedist work, notably the Explanatio compendiosaque applicatio artis Raymundi Lulli which explains how the Art is the introduction to all faculties: physics, mathematics, metaphysics, theology, ethics, medicine, and law. The seventeenth century, however, brought other approaches to systematic knowledge by Petrus Ramus and Descartes. Encyclopaedists such as Johann Heinrich Alsted wrote commentaries critically comparing the logics of Aristotle, Ramus, and Llull. It was in this milieu that Gottfried Wilhelm Leibniz probably became familiar with Llull. In 1666 Leibniz wrote the De arte combinatoria with the idea that all concepts can be generated through a combinatorial system.

References

Further reading
 Batllori, Miguel (1943). El lulismo en Italia. Ensayo de síntesis, «Revista de Filosofía» 2, pp. 255– 313; 479–537.
 Colomer, Eusebio (1961). Nikolaus von Kues und Raimund Llull. Berlin: De Gruyter.
 Hillgarth, J.N. (1971). Ramon Lull and Lullism in Fourteenth-Century France. Oxford: Clarendon Press.
 Pereira, Michela (1989).  The Alchemical Corpus attributed to Raymond Lull. London: The Warburg Institute.
 Ramis Barceló, R. (2018). "Academic Lullism from the Fourteenth to the Eighteenth Century." In A Companion to Ramon Llull and Lullism. Leiden: Brill.
 Rossi, Paolo (2000). Logic and the Art of Memory. The Quest for a Universal Language. Trans. S. Clucas, Chicago (Milan 1960).
 Rubí, L. B. (2018). "Lullism among French and Spanish Humanists of the Early 16th Century." In A Companion to Ramon Llull and Lullism. Leiden: Brill.
 Rubí, L. B. (2018). "Lullism in New Spain." In A Companion to Ramon Llull and Lullism. Leiden: Brill.
 Yates, Frances (1982). "Lull and Bruno" in Collected Essays: Lull & Bruno, vol. I, London: Routledge & Kegan Paul.

Hermeticism
Renaissance philosophy

ca:Lullisme